THDC Institute of Hydropower Engineering and Technology is an engineering college in Bhagirathipuram, Tehri, Uttarakhand. The institute was established in August 2011.

THDC-IHET has initiated the THDC-IHET Research and Development Center to promote renewable energy innovation by teams of scientists and engineers from the institute and any other institutes affiliated to UTU.

The institute has received the award for "Excellent Institute for Promoting Hydropower in Uttarakhand" in the second National Uttarakhand Education Summit & Awards 2015 by CMAI Association of India.

Dr. Sharad Kumar Pradhan has been appointed as the new director of the institute. He has taken charge on 17 December, 2022.

Campus
The campus is in Bhagirathipuram, New Tehri and near the famous Tehri Dam, Uttarakhand. (The climate is cool throughout the year.)

The campus is in sprawling 40 acres of land, 14 km from New Tehri. THDC IHET on a 20 acre.

Establishment
The institute was inaugurated by Sh. Sushilkumar Shinde, the then Minister of Power, in 2011.

Recognition
All India Council for Technical Education accorded approval. The institute is affiliated with Uttarakhand Technical University, Dehradun.

Academic departments
The institute offers regular B.Tech degree program in the following disciplines:
 Civil Engineering
 Computer Science & Engineering
 Electrical Engineering
 Electronics & Communication Engineering
 Mechanical Engineering

Admissions
The Bachelor of Technology admissions are based on UTU counselling (centralised counselling for colleges under Uttarakhand Technical University) and spot counselling conducted in the institute. 

Students can take admissions on basis of either JEE (mains) result or 12th (PCM) results.

There are total of 65 seats in B.Tech 1st year admissions in each branch, 5 of which are reserved for Dam Affected or THDC ward.

B.Tech(Lateral Entry) admissions can be opted by diploma students by participating in UKSEE counselling.

Activities

National Service Scheme

The National Service Scheme (NSS) is an Indian government sector public service program conducted by the Ministry of Youth Affairs and Sports of the Government of India. Popularly known as NSS, the scheme was launched in Gandhiji's Centenary year in 1969. Aimed at developing student's personality through community service, NSS is a voluntary association of young people in Colleges, Universities and at +2 level working for a campus-community (esp. Villages) linkage.

NSS is highly active in the campus conducting various cultural programs, blood donation camps, various awareness drives and many other events.
 
There are two units of NSS allotted to the college and they work under guidance of Mr. Nitin Kumar Gupta (Electrical Department).

Entrepreneurship Cell (E-Cell)
A club under guidance of Dr. Ramna Tripathi to motivate and drive students to create and learn about startups. Here, students develop their ideas to solve various problems.

SAE India THDC-IHET CLUB

SAE India holds competitions every year for engineering students across the country.
 SUPRA SAEINDIA Student Formula 
 Baja SAE India
 EFFI Cycle
 Aero Design
 Eco Kart

IEEE club
The IEEE's membership has long been composed of engineers and scientists. Allied professionals who are members include computer scientists, software developers, information technology professionals, physicists, and medical doctors, in addition to IEEE's electrical and electronics engineering core.

Escalade
Escalade was the mega inter-collegiate cultural fest of THDC-IHET, initiated in 2013, till 2015. Escalade promises fun, entertainment, gaming, singing, dancing, and many more. The highlights of the mega event of THDC-IHET are:
Zephyr – Intercollegiate Cultural Competition
Cresendo – The War of Bands
Akriti – The Art Fest
Fascino – The Fashion Event
Celeb Night
LAN Gaming
Inferno – The DJ Night

CIESZYC 
CIESZYC is the mega inter-collegiate techno-cultural fest at THDC-IHET, initiated in 2018.

References

External links
 
 University website
 Cultural fest website

Educational institutions established in 2007
New Tehri
Hydroelectricity in India
Engineering colleges in Uttarakhand
2007 establishments in Uttarakhand
.